Couzon is a commune in the Allier department in central France.

Population

Economy
The economy is based around forestry, agriculture and most people have small holdings.  This region was prized for its clay and there are many old 'Tuileries' which were the old tile-making sites. The weather used to be very hot in the summer with snow in the winter as it is quite high up, but the last couple of years have seen an increase in rain (to the point of damaging crops), and milder summers.

Facilities
The nearest small town and supermarket is ten minutes away at Bourbon L'Archambault, which was the original seat of the Dukes of Bourbon in medieval times and has the remains of a superb castle, it was also a Roman bath town. The nearest large town is Moulins, Allier.

There is also a house that Joan of Arc  is said to have stayed in.

Sport
There is an excellent sports complex and it is possible to go kayaking and canoeing on the river. There are also a variety of sports clubs including motorcross, archery, scuba diving, martial arts and rifle shooting.

See also
Communes of the Allier department

References

Communes of Allier
Allier communes articles needing translation from French Wikipedia